Diary of a Wimpy Kid: Rodrick Rules is a children's novel by American author and cartoonist Jeff Kinney, based on the FunBrain.com version. It is the sequel to Diary of a Wimpy Kid, followed by The Last Straw. The hardcover was released on February 1, 2008. Rodrick Rules was named New York Times bestseller among awards and praise. A live-action movie based on the book was released on March 25, 2011 and an animated film adaptation was released on Disney+ on December 2, 2022.

Plot
At the start of the book, Greg Heffley explains how bad his summer vacation was in which after being signed up with the swim team without his consent, he had to deal with practicing at 7:00 AM, being the worst swimmer on the team, being forced to wear his brother Rodrick’s skimpy hand-me-down racing speedo to save money while everyone else wears baggy swim trunks and his older brother Rodrick annoying him about a secret that Greg is trying to keep. After Rodrick puts him in the back of his van and finds every speed bump in town because their mother Susan wants Rodrick to pick him up after swim practice and school, he drops Greg off at school but Greg finds out he still has the Cheese Touch from last year. Luckily for him, he gets away with passing it on to a new student named Jeremy Pindle who doesn’t even know about the Cheese Touch.

Because Rodrick and Greg constantly complain to Susan about having no money, she starts a "Mom Bucks" program to get Greg and Rodrick to get along with each other. Rodrick immediately spends all of his money on some heavy metal magazines, while Greg carefully and sensibly manages his cash. Rodrick has an upcoming science project that he would prefer to do on 'Gravity', but he clearly shows no effort or interest, and asks his family members to do it for him. One time when Rodrick is ill, the parents leave Greg and Rodrick in charge of the house, thinking that Rodrick will not throw a party in his ill state. However, Rodrick jumps off the couch, calls every friend of his, and throws a party, locking Greg in the basement for the whole night. After the party ends the next day, Rodrick forces Greg into helping him clean up by threatening to reveal his secret. When Greg goes to the bathroom to take a shower, he realizes that someone wrote on the back of the door with a permanent marker. They swap the door in the bathroom with a closet door just as their parents come home. Their father Frank discovers that the new door doesn't lock, but to Greg and Rodrick's relief, he does not realize that it has been replaced.

A month later, while Greg was at Rowley's house playing board games, Greg notices Rowley has play money identical to that of "Mom Bucks" in one of the board games and takes it home to put under his mattress. When Greg fails to do his history homework, he decides to borrow an old assignment from Rodrick and pay him $20,000 in Mom Bucks ($200 in real money). Unfortunately, Greg realizes on the bus that the assignment is very badly written, realizing that Frank started doing Rodrick's homework for him once he started high school and is unable to turn in anything for his History class. On top of that, after Greg returns from school, Susan quickly uncovers the scheme when Rodrick tries to cash in every single Mom Buck Greg gave him as a down payment on a motorcycle, and as a result confiscates all of Greg's Mom Bucks, even his real ones. As a punishment, she makes him clean the entire garage, but Greg enlists Rowley to help him do that very quickly.
 
After Thanksgiving, Susan sends Frank out to the mail to get photos from Thanksgiving, and Rodrick's party is uncovered by a photo that Rodrick’s friend Bill accidentally took using Susan’s camera (in which Rodrick is visible), for which he is grounded for a month despite his denial that he had it. Greg is accused of being an accomplice to Rodrick and is banned from playing video games for two weeks (since he didn't say anything about the party), even though he had nothing to do with the party.
 
Rodrick starts preparing for the Crossland Elementary, Middle, and High School talent show with his band, despite being grounded. Eventually, Frank ends Rodrick's punishment two weeks early due to his heavy metal band, Löded Diper, driving him insane every single day. Rodrick goes to Bill’s house to practice. With Rodrick gone, Greg invites Rowley over for a sleepover. After Greg unintentionally injures Rowley's toe by putting a dumbbell in a pillow that Rowley kept kicking as a joke, Susan forces him to perform in the talent show with a first-grader named Scotty Douglas, whom Rowley was partners with, in Rowley's absence. They don't qualify during the auditions, but Rodrick's band, Löded Diper, does. Rodrick is so eager to perform at the talent show that he hands in his Gravity science project early but is forced to start over on account of the topic, experiment, failure to meet school requirements, and lack of sense.
 
Frank tries to persuade Rodrick to give up the show, but Rodrick insists on doing it so that he can send the tape of his performance to record label companies and drop out of school. During the talent show, Rodrick has his band's performance taped so he can send it to record companies to fulfill his wishes, but the video is rendered useless after it is found that Susan (who was taping the video) had talked the whole time and everything she said was heard on the tape, infuriating Rodrick. When his band comes over to watch the talent show on TV for fragments of their performance, they can't see anything as Susan dances on the stage, making the camera shake terribly. The school's judges who were filming Rodrick's band notice Susan and zoom the camera in on her, which means Rodrick doesn't have anything to send to record companies.
 
Rodrick first accuses Susan of messing things up, with her replying that if he doesn't allow people to dance, he shouldn't play music. He then accuses Greg of the incident for refusing to record the performance for him and they both get into a fight until their parents send them both to their rooms. Later, Rodrick reveals what happened to Greg over the summer to his friends, with Greg leading to tell the audience his side of the story: One summer, Greg and Rodrick had to stay at Leisure Towers, the retirement home where their grandfather lives, but Greg was bored and took out his journal to write in. However, Rodrick stole Greg's diary and ran, but tripped on a board game that was left on the floor. Greg grabbed his diary, ran to the restrooms, and attempted to destroy it, but then realized he was in the ladies bathroom. He was unable find a way to leave without being seen, and so stayed in the stall until he was eventually reported to the front desk as a suspected “Peeping Tom” and removed by security, which Rodrick saw on Grandpa's TV (which is always tuned to the security camera).
 
Nevertheless, Rodrick tells his friends, who tell their younger siblings, who then tell their friends, which twists the story from going to the women's bathroom in the retirement home to invading the girls' locker room at Crossland High School, thus earning Greg popularity from the boys, the nickname "Stealthinator", and disdain from the girls. The book ends with Greg helping Rodrick with his science project for school called "Do Plants Sneeze?", due to him feeling sorry for the video of Löded Diper's performance at the talent show, which has become a worldwide internet sensation due to Susan dancing in it.

Reception
Rodrick Rules received positive reviews. Positive attention was given to the book for its effective portrayal of Greg Heffley, and for its humor. The books' strategy of using illustrations as a means of exposition was also praised.

Sequels

Diary of a Wimpy Kid: Rodrick Rules is the second book in the seventeen  book series, "Diary of a Wimpy Kid". The third, The Last Straw was released on January 13, 2009.

Film adaptations

Live-action film

Brad Simpson stated he anticipated a sequel movie if the first film was a success. "Our writing staff are writing a sequel right now, "Rodrick Rules," which would be based on the second book" ... "And, you know, we hope that the people to see a second movie, so that we are in position of going again right away and making another film. I certainly know that the fans would like to see all the books made into movies."

Fox 2000 greenlit the sequel and Zachary Gordon returned as Greg Heffley. Steve Zahn (Frank Heffley), Devon Bostick (Rodrick Heffley) and Rachael Harris (Susan Heffley) also returned. The film was directed by David Bowers and the screenplay was written by Gabe Sachs and Jeff Judah. Principal photography began in Vancouver in August 2010. A few new characters appeared in the film, including Peyton List as Holly Hills. The film was released on March 25, 2011.

Animated film

On December 3, 2021, an animated film based on the first book was released on Disney+. On Disney+ Day 2021, Kinney revealed that the first sequel, based on Rodrick Rules, was released on December 2, 2022.

References

2008 American novels
Novels by Jeff Kinney
American novels adapted into films
Diary of a Wimpy Kid
Amulet Books books
2008 children's books